Pothyne birmanica is a species of beetle in the family Cerambycidae. It was described by Pic in 1930.

References

birmanica
Beetles described in 1930